The following lists events that happened during 1906 in Australia.

Incumbents

Monarch – Edward VII
Governor General – Henry Northcote, 1st Baron Northcote
Prime Minister – Alfred Deakin
Chief Justice – Samuel Griffith

State premiers
Premier of New South Wales – Joseph Carruthers
Premier of South Australia – Thomas Price
Premier of Queensland – Arthur Morgan (to 19 January), then William Kidston
Premier of Tasmania – John Evans
Premier of Western Australia – Cornthwaite Rason (to 7 May), then Newton Moore
Premier of Victoria – Thomas Bent

State governors
Governor of New South Wales – Sir Harry Rawson
Governor of South Australia – Sir George Ruthven Le Hunte
Governor of Queensland – Frederic Thesiger, 3rd Baron Chelmsford (from 30 November)
Governor of Tasmania – Sir Gerald Strickland
Governor of Western Australia – Admiral Sir Frederick Bedford
Governor of Victoria – Major General Sir Reginald Talbot

Events
27 January – A cyclone damages Cairns and Innisfail in Queensland.
6 February – The world's first surf lifesaving club is formed at Bondi Beach.
5 May – The first electric trams begin running in Melbourne from St Kilda to Brighton.
16 June – The town of Roma, Queensland becomes the first town in Australia to be lit and powered by natural gas, however the gas reserve only lasts ten days.
16 July – The Australian Army Cadet Corps is formed.
1 September – Control of British New Guinea is formally transferred to Australia from Britain.
12 December – 1906 Australian federal election: The government of Prime Minister Alfred Deakin is returned to power, however voter turn-out is low.

Science and technology
12 July – The first wireless radio transmission is made from the Australian mainland between Point Lonsdale, Victoria and Devonport, Tasmania.

Arts and literature

Film
26 December – The national premiere of The Story of the Kelly Gang, generally regarded as the world's first feature length film, takes place at the Athenaeum Hall in Melbourne.

Sport
26 January – New South Wales wins the Sheffield Shield.
26 April – 2 May – The 1906 Intercalated Games are held in Athens, Greece – Australia wins three bronze medals.
22 September – Carlton wins the VFL grand final, beating Fitzroy 15.4 (94) to 6.9 (45).
6 November – Poseidon wins the Melbourne Cup.

Births
19 January – Rachel Cleland, community worker (died 2002)
5 February – Alexander Spence, soldier (died 1983)
16 May – Ernie McCormick, cricketer (died 1991)
27 May – Raymond Ferrall, businessman, author and cricketer (died 2000)
17 July – Dunc Gray, Olympic cyclist (died 1996)
12 August – Harry Hopman, tennis player and coach (died 1985)
22 August – Lotus Thompson, silent film actress (died 1963)
31 August – Edwin Sherbon Hills, geologist (died 1986)
2 October – Thomas Hollway, Premier of Victoria (died 1971)
21 November – Tom Clarke, VFL footballer for Essendon (died 1981)
30 November – Mabel Miller, lawyer and politician (died 1978)
3 December – Frank Packer, media proprietor and father of Kerry Packer (died 1974)
9 December – Douglas Nicholls, Aboriginal pastor and Governor of South Australia (died 1988)
22 December – Clive Turnbull, Tasmanian author and journalist (died 1975)

Deaths

 1 January – Sir Hugh Nelson, 11th Premier of Queensland (born in the United Kingdom) (b. 1833)
 4 January – Jessie Rooke, suffragette and temperance reformer (born in the United Kingdom) (b. 1845)
 14 January – Henry Yelverton, Western Australian politician (b. 1854)
 6 February – James Bonwick, writer (born and died in the United Kingdom) (b. 1817)
 5 March – Hugh Ramsay, artist (born in the United Kingdom) (b. 1877)
 7 March – Frederick William Haddon, journalist (born in the United Kingdom) (b. 1839)
 14 March – George Coppin, Victorian politician, actor and entrepreneur (born in the United Kingdom) (b. 1819)
 21 March – Thomas Macdonald-Paterson, Queensland politician (born in the United Kingdom) (b. 1844)
 30 March – John Ferguson, Queensland politician (born in the United Kingdom) (b. 1830)
 10 April – Sir Adye Douglas, 15th Premier of Tasmania (born in the United Kingdom) (b. 1815)
 16 April – William Farrer, agronomist (born in the United Kingdom) (b. 1845)
 6 August – George Waterhouse, 6th Premier of South Australia and 7th Premier of New Zealand (born and died in the United Kingdom) (b. 1824)
 8 August – William Purkiss, Western Australian politician (b. 1844)
 3 September – Sir Samuel Davenport, South Australian politician (born in the United Kingdom) (b. 1818)
 31 October – Charles Troedel, printer (born in Germany) (b. 1836)
 22 November – Henry Brand, 2nd Viscount Hampden, 19th Governor of New South Wales (born and died in the United Kingdom) (b. 1841)

See also
 List of Australian films before 1910

References

 
Australia
Years of the 20th century in Australia